The 2019–20 LEN Euro League Women was the 33rd edition of the major competition for European women's water polo clubs. It is started on 31 October 2019 and it was scheduled to end with the Final 4 on 24 and 25 April 2020.

Overview

Calendar
The calendar of the tournament was announced by LEN on 11 June 2019.

Teams

Qualifying stage

Qualification round

Pools composition
The draw was held in Volos (Greece) on 8 September 2019, during the 2019 Women's LEN European Junior Water Polo Championship.

Group A
Venue: Polo Natatorio di Ostia, Ostia (Rome), Italy.

Group B
Venue: Alfréd Hajós National Swimming Stadium, Budapest, Hungary.

Group C
Venue: Schöneberger Schwimmsporthalle, Berlin, Germany.

Group D
Venue: Zwembad de Krommerijn, Utrecht, Netherlands.

†

Preliminary round
The draw was held at LEN offices in Nyon, Switzerland, on 5 November 2019.

Pools composition

Group E
Venue: Papastratio Petros Kapagerov National Swimming Hall, Piraeus, Greece.

Group F
Venue: Centre Can Llong, Sabadell, Spain.

Group G
Venue: Neftyanik Sports Complex, Kirishi, Russia.

Group H
Venue: Piscina Francesco Scuderi, Catania, Italy.

†

Knockout stage

Quarterfinals
The draw for the quarterfinals took place on 2 December 2019 at the Tollcross International Swimming Centre in Glasgow, Scotland, before the 2019 European Short Course Swimming Championships.

|}

First leg

See also
 2019–20 LEN Champions League
 2019–20 Women's LEN Trophy

References

External links
Official LEN website
Microplustiming (Official results website)

LEN Euro League Women seasons
Women, Euro League
E
E
LEN Euro League Women